Shayne Hollis (born April 2, 1989 ) is a Bermudian international footballer, who currently plays for Southampton Rangers.

Club career 
Hollis played in the 2010 season for the Bermuda Hogges in the USL Premier Development League. 2010 and 2011 played during the vacation with Island Soccer League club Knights. In the vacation of 2012 played for Bermudian Premier Division club Somerset Trojans. On 8 December 2012 was selected for the MLS Combine Draft. He was than on 9 January 2013 selected for the USL pro-combine, but he was not pulled by any club. He played after his resign for Island Soccer League club Knights.

He joined North Village Rams from Hamilton Parish in August 2015.

International career
Hollis won only a solo cap for the Bermuda national football team against Canada in 2007.

References

External links

1989 births
Living people
Association football forwards
Bermudian footballers
Bermuda international footballers
Bermuda Hogges F.C. players
North Village Rams players
USL League Two players